A list of films produced by the Bollywood film industry based in Mumbai in 1960

Highest-grossing films
The ten highest-grossing films at the Indian Box Office in 1960:

A-D

E-M

N-Z

References

External links
 Bollywood films of 1960 at the Internet Movie Database
 
 Indian Film Songs from the Year 1960 - A look back at 1960 with a special focus on Hindi film songs

1960
Bollywood
Films, Bollywood